Francis David Valentine (24 August 1863 – 22 May 1941) was an Australian politician.

He was born in Hobart. In 1912 he was elected to the Tasmanian House of Assembly as a Liberal member for Denison. He was defeated in 1913. Valentine died in Hobart in 1941.

References

1863 births
1941 deaths
Commonwealth Liberal Party politicians
Members of the Tasmanian House of Assembly
Politicians from Hobart